Pablo Pontons (1630 – 1691) was a Spanish Baroque painter, believed to have been a student of Pedro de Orrente, whose style he promoted.

Biography
He was born in Valencia. His mother was from Murcia and was apparently related to Orrente. Although he was Pontons's primary influence, his earliest work also shows elements of composition and coloring reminiscent of Jerónimo Jacinto de Espinosa.

Antonio Ponz, in volume four of his Viage de España, from 1774, gives praise to paintings representing the lives of Saints Peter Nolasco and Peter Pascual, at the convent of the  Mercedarios Calzados, but these appear to be lost. Another work for the same order, depicting Saint Raymond Nonnatus was at their convent in El Puig, but was later acquired by the Museo de Bellas Artes de Valencia. This work shows the influence of Espinosa, more than Orrente.

Pontons died in Valencia in 1691.

References

Further reading

External links

1606 births
1670 deaths
People from Valencia
Painters from the Valencian Community
17th-century Spanish painters
Spanish male painters
Spanish Baroque painters